Ludwig Hünersdorf (1748–1813) was a German equestrian.

1748 births
1813 deaths
German dressage riders
German male equestrians